Leonotis leonurus, also known as lion's tail and wild dagga, is a plant species in the mint family, Lamiaceae. The plant is a broadleaf evergreen large shrub native to South Africa and southern Africa, where it is very common.  It is known for its medicinal properties. The main psychoactive component of Leonotis leonurus is claimed to be leonurine, Leonotis leonurus has been confirmed to contain Leonurine according to peer reviewed journal published phytochemical analysis. Like other plants in the mint family, it also contains marrubiin.  The word "dagga" comes from Afrikaans, and derives in turn from the Khoikhoi "dachab". The word "dagga" has been extended to include cannabis in Afrikaans and South African English, so the use of "wild" serves to distinguish Leonotis leonuris from this.

Description
The plant has tubular orange flowers in tiered whorls, typical to the mint family, that encircle the square stems. They rise above the foliage mass during the summer season, with flowering continuing into winter in warmer climates.

Variation in flower color
A white variety (known colloquially as 'Alba') and a yellow variety also exist.

Ecology
The native habitat of Leonotis leonurus is damp grasslands of southern Africa. It attracts nectivorous birds (mainly sunbirds), as well as various insects such as butterflies. The flowers' mainly orange to orange-red colour and tubular shape are indicative of its co-evolution with African sunbirds, which have curved bills suited to feeding from tubular flowers.

Cultivation
Leonotis leonurus is cultivated as an ornamental plant for its copious orange blossom spikes, and is used as an accent or screen in gardens and parks. It is moderately drought tolerant, and a nectar source for birds and butterflies in landscape settings. It was introduced to Europe in the 1600s.

Lion's tail can be found in other subtropical and Mediterranean climate regions beyond South Africa, such as California, Hawaii, and Australia where it has naturalized in some areas. In cooler climates it is used as an annual and winter conservatory plant.

Pharmacology and toxicology
Marrubiin has both antioxidant and cardioprotective properties and has shown to significantly improve myocardial function.

Docosatetraenoylethanolamide (DEA) is a cannabinoid that acts on the cannabinoid (CB1) receptor which has been found in Leonotis leonurus var. albiflora Benth. whole flower extract.

Leonotis leonurus contains several labdane diterpene–based compounds such as Hispanolone, Leonurun, and Leoleorins. C-N

One experimental animal study suggests that the aqueous leaf extract of Leonotis leonurus possesses antinociceptive, antiinflammatory, and hypoglycemic properties.

An animal study in rats indicated that in high doses, lion's tail has significant toxicological adverse effects on organs, red blood cells, white blood cells, and other important bodily functions. Acute toxicity tests in animals caused death for those receiving a 3200 mg/kg dose. A 1600 mg/kg extract led to changes in red blood cells, hemoglobin concentration, mean corpuscular volume, platelets, and white blood cells.

Traditional uses
Infusions made from flowers, seeds, leaves, or stems are widely used to treat tuberculosis, jaundice, muscle cramps, high blood pressure, diabetes, viral hepatitis, dysentery, and diarrhoea. The leaves, roots, and bark are used as an emetic for snakebites, and bee and scorpion stings. The fresh stem juice is used as an infusion drink for "blood impurity" in some parts of South Africa.

Recreational uses
The dried leaves and flowers have a mild calming effect when smoked. In some users, the effects have been noted to be similar to that of the cannabinoid THC found in Cannabis, except that it has a much less potent high. It has also been reported to cause mild euphoria, visual changes, dizziness, nausea, sweating, sedation, and lightheadedness.

It is sometimes used as a Cannabis substitute by recreational users as an alternative to illegal psychoactive plants.

Legal status

Latvia
Leonotis leonurus has been illegal in Latvia since November 2009, and is classified as a Schedule 1 drug. Possession of quantities up to 1 gram are fined up to 280 euros. Possession and distribution of larger quantities can be punished with up to 15 years in prison.

Poland
Leonotis leonurus was banned in Poland in March 2009. Possession and distribution lead to criminal charges.

See also
 Leonurine
 Leonurus cardiaca
 Leonurus japonicus
 Leonotis nepetifolia
 Leonurus sibiricus

References

External links

 Missouri Botanical Garden - Kemper Garden Center: Leonotis leonurus
 United States Department of Agriculture profile of Leonotis leonurus (lion's ear)

Butterfly food plants
Drought-tolerant plants
Endemic flora of South Africa
Entheogens
Garden plants of Southern Africa
Lamiaceae
Medicinal plants
Plants used in traditional African medicine